Plagiotremus phenax, the Imposter fangblenny, is a species of combtooth blenny found in coral reefs in the Indian ocean.  This species reaches a length of  TL. This blenny uses bio mimicry to avoid predation, as it has a strong resemblance to the disco blenny (Meiacanthus smithi).

References

External links
 

phenax
Fish described in 1976